The 2012 Campeonato Amazonense de Futebol was the 96th season of the top professional football league in Amazonas, Brazil. The competition began on January 28 and ended on May 26. Nacional won the championship for the 41st time, while CDC Manicoré and Operário were relegated.

Format
The tournament consists of a double round-robin format, in which all twelve teams play each other twice, with classification split in two stages. Each round counts as one stage. The four better-placed teams of each stage will face themselves in playoffs matches, and the first stage champion will face the second stage champion. If the same team win both stages, it will be considered the champion.

The bottom two teams on overall classification will be relegated.

Qualifications
The champion qualifies to 2013 Campeonato Brasileiro Série D. The two stage winner qualifies to the 2013 Copa do Brasil.

Participating teams

First round - Taça Estado do Amazonas

Standings

Results

Semifinals

First leg

Second leg

Finals

First leg

Second leg

Second round - Taça Cidade de Manaus

Standings

Results

Semifinals

First leg

Second leg

Finals

First leg

Second leg

Finals

First leg

Second leg

Overall classification

References

Amazonense
Campeonato Amazonense